Didam may refer to:

People 
Musa Didam (1933–2018), former District Head of the Fantswam (Kafanchan Kewaye)
Wilhelm Schneider-Didam (1869–1923), German portrait painter

Places 
Didam, town in the Netherlands 
Didam railway station, located in Didam, Netherlands
Didam Open, was a darts tournament in Didam, Netherlands